Hakea clavata, commonly known as coastal hakea is a shrub that is endemic to an area along the south coast of Western Australia. It has thick leaves, pink and grey flowers and grows on rocky outcrops.

Description
Sometimes club-shaped widening at the apex. The inflorescence has 60-80 white and pink flowers appearing in short racemes in leaf axils and tips of branches. The perianth has a pink claw, grey limbs and white interior. Alternatively egg-shaped with the wider section toward the apex, both shapes having two small horns at the back of the fruit. Each seed has a broad wing along one side of seed body.

Taxonomy
Hakea clavata was first formally described in 1805 by Jacques Labillardière in Novae Hollandiae plantarum specimen. Labillardière may have made a type collection when at the Esperance region in December 1792. The specific epithet (clavata) is derived from the Latin word clava meaning "club",  referring to the club-shape of the leaves.

Distribution
Coastal hakea is found on the mainland and on some of the islands between Israelite Bay and Esperance and a single population is known at Hopetoun to the west. The range covers southeastern areas of the Southwest Botanical Province. The species grows in rocky sandy clay soils among granite outcrops and withstands salt laden winds.

References

Eudicots of Western Australia
clavata
Plants described in 1805